North Country Cheviot is a common breed of sheep raised mainly for meat production. Originated from Scotland.

History
In 1791, Sir John Sinclair brought ewes from the Cheviot Hills near the English border to the counties of Caithness and Sutherland in north Scotland. He named these sheep "Cheviots" after the hill area they originated. Another hill breed was introduced into the ranges of central Scotland thus the Scottish Blackface created a definite separation between northern counties of Caithness and Sutherland and the border region in southern Scotland. Most authorities speculate that both English and Border Leicesters may have been introduced into the North Country Cheviots at this time. The result was a larger sheep that had a longer fleece, and one that matured earlier. The North Country is about twice the size of its southern relative.

In 1912, Caithness and Sutherland breeders formed the North Country Sheep Breeders Association to manage shows and sales. In 1945, the organization was reformed into the existing North Country Cheviot Sheep Society for registration, exporting, promotion and breed improvement.

Characteristics

Physical Characteristics  
North Country Cheviots are considered a large breed of sheep, they are deep, broad, and long throughout the body. Their head and legs are covered with white, short hair. They have a long roman nose and are polled. the nostrils and eyes are typically outlined with black.

Temperament 
They are a hardy, strong willed, independent breed of sheep that do well in harsh climates and on rough pastures. They are lamb easily with excellent mothering instincts. Their off spring are vigorous at birth and have high survival rates, although they only have an average rate of gain they make up for it in the quality and yield of their carcass. North Country Cheviots are excellent for crossbreeding both through the dam and sire, they pass on their maternal strengths and desirable carcasses to any offspring. The breed has a considerably longer working life than most of the other breeds.

Weight 

Rams weigh form 100-120kg, ewes weigh form 55-80kg, and their fleece weighs 2–2.3kg

References

External links
Irish North Country Cheviot Breeder website
UK North Country Cheviot website

Sheep breeds
Sheep breeds originating in Scotland